Creeping bent can be:

Agrostis stolonifera, a species of bentgrass.
Creeping Bent (record label), a record label based in Glasgow, Scotland.